Arneberg is a Norwegian surname. Notable people with the surname include:

Arnstein Arneberg (1882–1961), Norwegian architect
Christen Larsen Arneberg (1808–1874), Norwegian politician
Per Arneberg (1901–1981), Norwegian poet, prosaist and translator
Tor Arneberg (1928–2015), Norwegian sailor
Ulrik Arneberg (disambiguation), multiple people
Urda Arneberg (1929–2000), Norwegian actress
David Arneberg (1996-Present), American Fighter Pilot

Norwegian-language surnames